Song-Köl (also Соңкөл Songköl, literally "following lake", also  ) is an alpine lake in northern Naryn Region, Kyrgyzstan. It lies at an altitude of 3016 m, and has an area of about 270 km2 and volume of 2.64 km3. The lake's maximum length is 29 km, breadth about 18 km, and the deepest point is 13.2 m. It is the second largest lake in Kyrgyzstan after Issyk-Kul, and the largest fresh water lake in Kyrgyzstan.

Geography

High altitude Song-Köl belongs to the Naryn river basin. The lake sits in the central part of Song-Köl Valley surrounded by Songköl Too ridge from the north, and Borbor Alabas and Moldo Too mountains from the south. Hydrologically, the Song-Köl basin is characterized by poorly developed surface stream flows, and substantial subsurface flow. Four perennial rivers - Kumbel, Aktash, Tashdöbö, and Karakeche - disgorge themselves into the lake. In the south-east, the structural high is cut through by the river Kajyrty (in its upper course also called Song-Köl) that flows into the Naryn.

Environment

Climate
Annual precipitation averages 300–400 mm from April to October, and 100–150 mm from November to March. Snow cover in the lake basin persists for 180 to 200 days a year. In winter the lake surface freezes, the ice becoming as much as 1-1.2 m thick. The ice on the Song-Köl begins to thaw in the middle or at the end of April, and completely disappears by late May.

Ecology
In 2011, Song-Köl was designated by Kyrgyzstan as its third Wetland of International Importance for the Ramsar List. Since 1998, a section of the lake and its shore (3,400 ha land, 5,200 ha water) is protected as part of the Karatal-Japyryk Nature Reserve.

History 
There are several signs of nomadic life from the earlier times in the Son Kul valley. Ancient petroglyphs can be found east from the lake and there are round stone settings that have similarities with the ones found in Mongolia and Altai area. Several different sized burial mounds can be also found around the lake.

References

Lakes of Kyrgyzstan
Mountain lakes
Ramsar sites in Kyrgyzstan